Germaine Schneider (17 March 1903 - 12 November 1945) was a Belgian communist and Communist International (Comintern) agent.  During the latter half of the 1920s, Schneider worked predominantly for the
Communist Party of Belgium. During the interwar period and early World War II, Schneider was a core member of a Soviet espionage group. She worked as a principal courier for the groups that were associated with the Comintern agent, Henry Robinson in the late 1930s in France and later the Soviet GRU officer, Konstantin Jeffremov in Belgium and the Low Countries, in the early 1940s. These groups were later identified by the Abwehr under the moniker the Red Orchestra. Schneider used the aliases Clais, Pauline, Odette, Papillon and Butterfly (Schmetterling) to disguise her identity.

Life

Schneider had been living and working in Brussels since 1920. In January 1925, Germaine Schneider ( Clais) married Swiss national Franz Schneider. The couple had a long honeymoon in Switzerland before returning in Brussels two months later. That same year, Schneider was recruited into the Communist International (Comintern) organisation. Between 1925 and 1929, Schneider provided safehouse accommodation for travellers who were members of the Comintern. At the same time she worked for the Communist Party of Belgium.  Schneider's apartment saw many communists come and go including Maurice Thorez and Jacques Duclos. In 1929, she was deported from Belgium as a communist agitator but made a clandestine return to the country after a short period. From 1929 to 1936, the Schneiders were politically inactive and lived a relatively quiet life in Brussels. In 1936, while the couple were living in Brussels, they were recruited as Soviet agents of the Red Army Intelligence to work as couriers. The couple had an apartment at 47 Rue de la comtesse de Flandre in Brussels.

Couriering

Robinson network
In the autumn of 1935, Harry II, an unidentified Soviet agent of the Red Army Intelligence took over control of Ernest Weiss, a Soviet agent resident in London, who was recruited in 1932 to run an espionage network in the United Kingdom. The German- born Weiss resided in London and had become a naturalised British citizen to disguise his activities.

In November 1936, Harry II introduced Schneider to Ernest Weiss in South Kensington, London. During that period from 1936 to 1939, Schneider visited Weiss at his home in South Kensington several more times as well as working as a courier in France, Netherlands, Switzerland, Germany.

From 1939 to 1942, Germaine Schneider and her husband worked as a couriers for a Soviet espionage network that operated in the Low Countries that became known as the Red Orchestra.

In early 1938, Johann Wenzel returned illegally to Belgium and it is likely that he resided with the couple. At the time, Wenzel trained Schneider as a wireless telegraphy radio operator.

Jeffremov network

It is unknown who recruited Schneider into the Jeffremov network, but by September 1939, Schneider and her husband were working for  Konstantin Jeffremov in Belgium as couriers. As well as working as an assistant to  Léon Grossvogel, Schneider was the principal courier between the Belgium and French networks.

Schneider recruited a significant number of people into the Jeffremov network and managed those people as a sub-network with the Jeffremov network. These included her sisters Renee Blumsack, who was a courier between Paris and Brussels and Josephine Verhimst also a courier, as well as Renee's husband, Joseph Blumsack who was also a courier between Brussels and Paris,  was Josephine's lover, Jean Janssens, also a courier on the same route and Yvonne Poelmans, a gymnast and masseuse who was recruited for a minor role.

In May 1942, Leopold Trepper, who was the technical director of a Soviet Red Army Intelligence unit in western Europe, and the Soviet agent Konstantin Jeffremov. met in the house of the Schneider's in Brussels. At the meeting, Trepper placed Jeffremov in charge of running an espionage network in Belgium and the Low Countries. Schneider then became a courier between Jeffremov in Brussels and Trepper in Paris.

Arrest
In November 1942, Schneider was arrested while she was working for the Springer group in Lyon. She was betrayed by Jeffremov. Schneider was sent to a concentration camp and was liberated by the Red Army advance in May 1945. She was gravely ill when she left Ravensbrück concentration camp and was sent to a Swiss sanitarium in Zurich in October 1945.

Death
She died on 12 November 1945 of cancer. Her funeral was attended by Maurice Aenis-Hanslin, a Swiss communist and commercial director who was an agent of the network run by Henry Robinson.

Bibliography

Notes

References

Sources

External links
 British intelligence file on Germaine and Franz Schneider at the National Archives

1903 births
1945 deaths
People from Anderlecht
Red Orchestra (espionage)
Women spies
Belgian Comintern people
Deaths from cancer in Switzerland